Linda Jackson (born November 13, 1958 in Nepean, Ontario) is best known as a former Canadian professional bicycle road racer.  She is now a coach, having previous experience as an investment banker. Jackson won the bronze medal at the 1996 World Road Racing Championships. The six-time Canadian national champion (three for road race and three for time trials) competed at the 1996 Summer Olympics and several Pan American Games and won silver medals the 1994 road race and 1998 time trial at the Commonwealth Games.

At the 1994 Redlands Bicycle Classic, the Ontario native placed third overall and won Stage 1, a 48-mile road race. In 1997 she reached the podium again, this time in second overall and won Stage 2, a 13-mile individual time trial.

In 1997, she captured overall win at the Tour de l'Aude Cycliste Féminin and finished second at the Women's Challenge and Giro d'Italia Femminile, and placed third at the Tour de France Feminin. Jackson received the maglia arancia (orange jersey) as the best foreigner of that year's Giro d'Italia Femminile. The following year, Jackson won the 1998 Women's Challenge and repeated her second-place finish at the Giro d'Italia Femminile.

In 2000,  she retired from racing, even though she had qualified for the 2000 Summer Olympics.  Shortly after announcing her retirement, she began working as a chief financial officer of a San Francisco internet start-up company.

Currently, Jackson serves as the Director Sportif of the Team TIBCO elite women's cycling team.

References

External links 
 Linda Jackson retires from cycling
 

1958 births
Living people
Canadian female cyclists
Cyclists at the 1996 Summer Olympics
Olympic cyclists of Canada
Women chief financial officers
Commonwealth Games medallists in cycling
Commonwealth Games silver medallists for Canada
Cyclists at the 1994 Commonwealth Games
Cyclists at the 1998 Commonwealth Games
20th-century Canadian women
21st-century Canadian women
Medallists at the 1994 Commonwealth Games
Medallists at the 1998 Commonwealth Games